Mark Peter Zatezalo (born March 16, 1952) is an American politician who has served in the West Virginia House of Delegates since 2020. A hydrogeologist by training, Zatezalo also served in the House of Delegates from 2014 to 2018.

References

Living people
Republican Party members of the West Virginia House of Delegates
1952 births